Manhan Sharif

Manhan Sharif is one of the 28 unions of Kot Addu, District Muzaffar Garh

Main crops
Corn
Rice
Sugarcane
Cotton

Location
It is located in the south west of Kot Addu city

Water resources
This area is irrigated by a canal named Nala Sardar which is the Dis-tributary of Muzaffargarh canal

Products
The people of this area Produce Jaggery from the sugarcane and also grow Wheat and Rice at industrial level

Nearby industries
Kot Addu Power Company (Kapco)  (7 km)
Fatima Sugar Mill  (35 km)
Sheikho Sugar Mills  (38 km)
Pak Arab Refinery Limited  (50 km)
Lal-peer Thermal Power Station

References

Muzaffargarh District